Lalitpur may refer to:

 Lalitpur, India, a town in Uttar Pradesh, the headquarters of the namesake district
 Lalitpur District, India, a district of Uttar Pradesh
 Lalitpur Assembly constituency
 Lalitpur, Nepal (historically named Patan), the headquarters of the following district
 Lalitpur District, Nepal, a district in Nepal